DepoDur CII, previously known as DepoMorphine, is a morphine sulfate extended-release liposome injection (see Depot injection), product of Pacira Pharmaceuticals (formerly SkyePharma PLC). It was approved by the U.S. Food and Drug Administration (FDA) in 2004 for use as a post-surgical pain reliever. In Europe, it was approved by the Medicines and Healthcare products Regulatory Agency in 2006.

It is a one-time injection (during or shortly after surgery) that maintains a therapeutically effective level of morphine in the patient's bloodstream for 48 hours.

External links
 DepoDur official web site
 Pacira Pharmaceuticals company web site

Analgesics